"Jesus Bids Us Shine" is a children's hymn with words by Susan Bogert Warner (1819-1885) and music by Edwin Othello Excell (1851-1921).  It was first published in the children's magazine The Little Corporal in 1868.
Actor Leo McKern was heard singing the famous last line "You in your small corner, And I in mine" in the comedic film Decline and Fall... of a Birdwatcher (1968).

Lyrics

Jesus bids us shine,
With a pure, clear light,
Like a little candle,
Burning in the night.
In this world is darkness,
So let us shine--
You in your small corner,
And I in mine.

Jesus bids us shine,
First of all for Him;
Well He sees and knows it,
If our light grows dim;
He looks down from heaven,
To see us shine--
You in your small corner,
And I in mine.

Jesus bids us shine,
Then, for all around
Many kinds of darkness
In this world are found -
Sin, and want, and sorrow;
So we must shine,
You in your small corner,
And I in mine.

Susan Warner

See also 

 "You in Your Small Corner", a stage play, also televised in 1962

External links
 Jesus Bids Us Shine at The Internet Archive.
 Free download at Hymnswithoutwords.com

American Christian hymns
English children's songs